Gerhard Rosenkrone Schjelderup (November 17, 1859 – July 29, 1933) was a Norwegian composer, known especially for his operas.

Biography 
Schjelderup was born in Kristiansand. Norway. One of five children, each with an artistic bent, his talent was encouraged from youth.  The composer Mon Schjelderup was his cousin.  In 1878 he traveled to Paris, where he studied cello with Auguste Franchomme and music theory with Augustin Savard.  He also studied with Jules Massenet at the Conservatoire de Paris.  By the time of his return to Norway, in 1884, he had already written a number of works.

Schjelderup was introduced to the work of Richard Wagner while in Paris, and went to Germany for further exposure to his work.  This in turn inspired him to write operas, which were to prove the bulk of his output, though he also composed a number of orchestral and chamber works.  He also wrote on music for Norwegian publications, and wrote biographies of Edvard Grieg and of Wagner.  In 1921 together with Ole Mørk Sandvik, he published Norsk folkemusik, særlig Østlandsmusikken which was the first history of Norwegian  music.

Schjelderup was among the founders of the Norwegian Society of Composers (Norsk komponistforening) in 1917, and from that year until 1920 served as its chairman.  He continued to promote Norwegian music despite living abroad; he died at Benediktbeuern in Bavaria, Germany during 1933.

Operas
 Austanfyre sol og vestanfyre måne (1889-1890) – one act performed at Munich, 1990
 Sonntagmorgen (1891–92) – Munich, 1893
 Norwegische Hochzeit (1894) – Prague, 1900 
as Bruderovet –Kristiania, 1919
 En hellig aften (1895) – Kristiania, 1915
 Sampo Lappelill (1890-1900) (see Sampo Lappelill)
 Et folk i nød (1906–07)
 Vårnatt (1906–07) – Dresden, 1908 
 Opal (1915) – Dresden, 1915
 Den røde pimpernell
 Sturmvögel – Schwerin, 1926
 Liebesnächte (1930) – Lübeck 1934

Documents 
Letters by Gerhard Schjelderup held by the State Archives in Leipzig, company archives of the Music Publishing House C.F.Peters (Leipzig).

References

External links
Gerhard Schjelderup: Obscure Operas

1859 births
1933 deaths
Conservatoire de Paris alumni
Norwegian classical composers
Norwegian musicologists
Norwegian opera composers
Musicians from Kristiansand
Norwegian male classical composers